The Black River is a river in Simcoe County in Central Ontario, Canada. It is part of the Great Lakes Basin, and is a left tributary of the Severn River.

Course
The river begins at an unnamed lake in geographic Matchedash Township, and flows to its mouth at Gloucester Pool on the Severn River. The Severn River flows to the Georgian Bay on Lake Huron.

See also
List of rivers of Ontario

References

Other map sources:

Rivers of Simcoe County